James Johnson (January 1, 1774 – August 13, 1826) was a U.S. Representative from Kentucky, brother of Richard Mentor Johnson and John Telemachus Johnson and uncle of Robert Ward Johnson.

Born in Orange County in the Virginia Colony, Johnson moved with his father to Kentucky in 1779.
He pursued preparatory studies.
He was a member of the State senate in 1808.
He served as lieutenant colonel in the War of 1812 and fought alongside his brother Richard at the Battle of the Thames.

He was a contractor for furnishing supplies to troops on the western frontier in 1819 and 1820. (See: Yellowstone expedition)
He served as presidential elector on the ticket of Monroe and Tompkins in 1820.

Johnson was elected as a Jacksonian to the Nineteenth Congress and served from March 4, 1825, until his death in Washington, D.C., August 13, 1826. He was interred in the family cemetery, Great Crossings, Kentucky.

See also

 The Family (Arkansas politics)
 List of United States Congress members who died in office (1790–1899)

References

1774 births
1826 deaths
People from Orange County, Virginia
Virginia colonial people
Richard Mentor Johnson family
American people of Scottish descent
Jacksonian members of the United States House of Representatives from Kentucky
Kentucky state senators
United States Army officers
American military personnel of the War of 1812